Epimedium grandiflorum, the large flowered barrenwort, or bishop's hat, is a species of flowering plant in the family Berberidaceae, native to Japan and Korea.

Description
In spring it produces pink, white, yellow or purple long-spurred flowers. The Latin specific epithet grandiflorum means large-flowered.

Cultivation
Numerous cultivars have been selected for garden use, of which the following have gained the Royal Horticultural Society's Award of Garden Merit: 
E. grandiflorum 'Akagi-Zakura'
E. grandiflorum 'Circe'

Use
It is commonly packed in a capsule with other ingredients or sold as herbal flakes or powder with the name "horny goat weed".

References

External links
 
 

grandiflorum
Plants described in 1851
Flora of China
Flora of Japan
Flora of Korea
Plants used in traditional Chinese medicine